Blaubär und Blöd is a German children's comedy television series which aired from 14 September 2002 to 17 February 2008. The series is based on the novels by German author Walter Moers.

See also
Käpt’n Blaubär Club (1993 – 2001)
List of German television series

Literature

References

External links
 

German children's television series
2002 German television series debuts
2008 German television series endings
German-language television shows
Nautical television series
German television shows featuring puppetry
Sequel television series